Dowdeswell is a surname, and may refer to:

 Caroline Dowdeswell (born 1945), English television actress
 Colin Dowdeswell (born 1955), tennis player
 Elizabeth Dowdeswell (born 1944), Lieutenant Governor of the Canadian province of Ontario
 James Dowdeswell (born 1974), stand-up comedian and actor
 Louis Dowdeswell (born 1993), English jazz trumpeter
 Peter Dowdeswell (born 1940), English competitive eater
 Richard Dowdeswell (died 1673) (1601–1673), English politician
 Roger Dowdeswell (born 1944), tennis player from Zimbabwe, elder brother of Colin Dowdeswell
 William Dowdeswell (1682–1728), English politician
 William Dowdeswell (Chancellor) (1721–1775), British politician
 William Dowdeswell (British Army officer) (1760–1828), English politician
 William Edward Dowdeswell (1841–1893), English politician
 William Dowdeswell (1804–1870), English politician

References 

English-language surnames